The 2023 IMSA SportsCar Championship (known for sponsorship reasons as the 2023 WeatherTech SportsCar Championship) is the 53rd racing season sanctioned by the International Motor Sports Association, which traces its lineage back to the 1971 IMSA GT Championship. It is also the tenth season of the IMSA SportsCar Championship since the merger between the American Le Mans Series and the Rolex Sports Car Series in 2014, and the eighth under the sponsorship of WeatherTech. The 2023 season marks an overhaul season for the championship, with a change in class structure and a new race on the season calendar at Indianapolis Motor Speedway. The championship began with the 24 Hours of Daytona on January 28 and is scheduled to conclude with the Petit Le Mans on October 14 after 11 races.

Classes

 IMSA Grand Touring Prototype (GTP) (LMDh and LMH)
 Le Mans Prototype 2 (LMP2)
 Le Mans Prototype 3 (LMP3)
 GT Daytona Pro (GTD Pro)
 GT Daytona (GTD)

At the end of the 2022 season, IMSA retired the Daytona Prototype International (DPi) class, which was the premier racing class in the WeatherTech Championship from 2017 until 2022, spanning six seasons. IMSA replaced it with a new class called GTP, named in tribute to the GTP class from the IMSA GT Championship in the 1980s.

GTP is the new flagship class of the championship and consists of two sister technical regulations: LMDh (Le Mans Daytona hybrid), and LMH (Le Mans Hypercar). LMDh allows choosing from a base chassis, of which there are four choices, from Dallara, Ligier, Multimatic, and Oreca, as well as a specification hybrid system on all cars, with freedom on aerodynamics, bodywork, and engine configuration. The LMH regulation allows bespoke hybrid designs and offers more mechanical design freedom in exchange for elevated development costs. As with the DPi class, GTP is regulated by a Balance of Performance (BoP) system to keep the performance range of each of the cars close together and regulate spending.

The GTP class consists of the same framework as the Hypercar class of the FIA World Endurance Championship. A collaborative alliance between IMSA and the French racing organizers, ACO, resulted in the convergence of the two organizers' top-class regulations.

After initially announcing discontinuing the sub-championship entirely on August 5, IMSA later declared on September 1 that they would continue the WeatherTech Sprint Cup, a championship comprising only sprint rounds for the GT Daytona (GTD) class. The only difference was that there would be no Sprint Cup-only rounds for 2023, to combat situations such as the record-low six-car GTD entry at the 2022 Chevrolet Grand Prix.

Schedule

The provisional schedule was released on August 5, 2022, and features 11 rounds.

 Mid-Ohio Sports Car Course was dropped from the calendar. The track had been a part of the championship since 2018. The event was replaced with a sprint race at Indianapolis Motor Speedway, marking IMS' return to the championship for the first time since the series' inaugural season in 2014.
 The Raceway on Belle Isle was also dropped from the calendar as a result of the Belle Isle circuit being replaced in favor of the Detroit street circuit. The track was a part of the championship for every season of the IMSA SportsCar Championship since its inception in 2014, except for 2020 due to the COVID-19 pandemic.
 On December 1, 2022, it was announced that the Rolex 24 Qualifying Race had been canceled for 2023, with the race reverting to a traditional qualifying format. Qualifying will take place on January 22, the final day of the "Roar Before the Rolex 24" preseason test.

Rule Changes 

 In response to the 2022 Six Hours of The Glen which saw several cars penalized for drive-time infringements as a result of a red flag for inclement weather, IMSA will now reduce the required drive time by a ratio of 2:1 corresponding to a percentage of the race time lost, rather than 1:1 as had been the rule previously. For example: If a race is shortened by 10 percent due to a red flag condition, each driver's minimum required drive time would be reduced by 20 percent.
 The minimum sprint race drive time for bronze-categorized drivers in the GTD Class has been reduced from 45 minutes to 35 minutes.
 As an incentive for bronze-categorized drivers to participate in qualifying in the GTD Class, teams whose qualifying time is set by a bronze-categorized driver will be permitted to change tires for the start of the race, while teams utilizing drivers of any other categorization must start the race on the tires used in qualifying.
 For drivers competing in more than one car during a race, the cumulative maximum drive time no longer applies to races under 6 hours in length.

Entries

Grand Touring Prototype (GTP)

Le Mans Prototype 2 (LMP2) 

In accordance with the 2017 LMP2 regulations, all cars in the LMP2 class use the Gibson GK428 V8 engine.

Le Mans Prototype 3 (LMP3) 

In accordance with the 2020 LMP3 regulations, all cars in the LMP3 class use the Nissan VK56DE 5.6L V8 engine.

GT Daytona (GTD Pro / GTD)

Race Results 
Bold indicates overall winner.

Championship standings

Points systems 
Championship points are awarded in each class at the finish of each event. Points are awarded based on finishing positions in qualifying and the race as shown in the chart below.

 Drivers points

Points are awarded in each class at the finish of each event.

 Team points

Team points are calculated in exactly the same way as driver points, using the point distribution chart. Each car entered is considered its own "team" regardless if it is a single entry or part of a two-car team.

 Manufacturer points

There are also a number of manufacturer championships which utilize the same season-long point distribution chart. The manufacturer championships recognized by IMSA are as follows:

 Daytona Prototype international (DPi): Engine & bodywork manufacturer
 GT Daytona Pro (GTDP): Car manufacturer
 GT Daytona (GTD): Car manufacturer

Each manufacturer receives finishing points for its highest finishing car in each class. The positions of subsequent finishing cars from the same manufacturer are not taken into consideration, and all other manufacturers move up in the order.

 Example: Manufacturer A finishes 1st and 2nd at an event, and Manufacturer B finishes 3rd. Manufacturer A receives 35 first-place points while Manufacturer B would earn 32 second-place points.

 Michelin Endurance Cup

The points system for the Michelin Endurance Cup is different from the normal points system. Points are awarded on a 5–4–3–2 basis for drivers, teams and manufacturers. The first finishing position at each interval earns five points, four points for second position, three points for third, with two points awarded for fourth and each subsequent finishing position.

At Rolex 24 at Daytona, points are awarded at 6 hours, 12 hours, 18 hours and at the finish. At the Sebring 12 hours, points are awarded at 4 hours, 8 hours and at the finish. At the Watkins Glen 6 hours, points are awarded at 3 hours and at the finish. At the Petit Le Mans (10 hours), points are awarded at 4 hours, 8 hours and at the finish.

Like the season-long team championship, Michelin Endurance Cup team points are awarded for each car and drivers get points in any car that they drive, in which they are entered for points. The manufacturer points go to the highest placed car from that manufacturer (the others from that manufacturer not being counted), just like the season-long manufacturer championship.

For example: in any particular segment manufacturer A finishes 1st and 2nd and manufacturer B finishes 3rd. Manufacturer A only receives first-place points for that segment. Manufacturer B receives the second-place points.

Drivers' Championships

Standings: Grand Touring Prototype (GTP)

Standings: Le Mans Prototype 2 (LMP2) 

‡: Points count towards Michelin Endurance Cup championship only

Standings: Le Mans Prototype 3 (LMP3) 

‡: Points count towards Michelin Endurance Cup championship only

Standings: GT Daytona Pro (GTD Pro)

Standings: GT Daytona (GTD)

Teams' Championships

Standings: Grand Touring Prototype (GTP) 

Notes:

Standings: Le Mans Prototype 2 (LMP2) 

‡: Points only awarded towards Michelin Endurance Cup championship

Standings: Le Mans Prototype 3 (LMP3) 

‡: Points only awarded towards Michelin Endurance Cup championship

Standings: GT Daytona Pro (GTD Pro)

Standings: GT Daytona (GTD)

Manufacturers' Championships

Standings: Grand Touring Prototype (GTP)

Standings: GT Daytona Pro (GTD Pro)

Standings: Grand Touring Daytona (GTD)

Notes

References

External links

WeatherTech SportsCar Championship seasons
IMSA SportsCar Championship
IMSA SportsCar Championship
IMSA SportsCar Championship
2023 WeatherTech SportsCar Championship season